Aedes (Neomacleaya) spermathecus or Verrallina spermathecus, is a species complex of zoophilic mosquito belonging to the genus Aedes. It is endemic to Sri Lanka

References

External links
Neomacleaya Theobald, 1907 - Mosquito Taxonomic Inventory

simplex
Insects described in 1951